Prema Katha Chitra 2 is a 2019 Telugu-language horror comedy film written and directed by Hari Kishan and produced by R. Sudarshan Reddy. The film stars Sumanth Ashwin and Nandita Swetha. It is a sequel to the 2013 film Prema Katha Chitram directed by J Prabhakar Reddy and Maruthi. The movie was released on 6 April 2019. The Hindi dubbing rights for the film sold for 1.5 Crore.

Plot
After the incident of Lakshmi in the first film, Sudheer and Nandu fell in love. But upon Nandu's condition, they decided to keep their relationship  secret. Sudheer had come to college to finish his studies, there, he quarreled with Bindu, his junior, a lead smoke girl who later loved him. He rejected her  proposals, which made her commit suicide on her birthday, when Sudheer was not there. After a while, Sudheer's friend Bablu discovers relationship between Sudheer and Nandu and presses him to see her. Without any other option , Sudheer takes him to his villa, where, Bablu noticed supernatural events of Nandu, which made him scare. Then Sudheer tells him about his plight that Nandu was possessed again by an unknown spirit, which made him scare every day at night, sometimes trying to kill herself and she also tried to kill him. After some scary comical circumstances they both decide to find out about the spirit and invite their friend Anita to be friends with the ghost. After having a chat with Anita, they come to know that Bindu has committed suicide. Then they suspect that Bindu might be the spirit, then after knowing the facts, Anita reveals that Bindu knows about their relationship and she tries to threaten Nandu to drop out, but Nandu warns Bindu and leaves that place.
So they try to communicate with the spirit, but she threatens all of them and bangs them out. They confirm that Bindu is the spirit because she recognized Anita. Then in a final attempt Sudheer tries hard to communicate with Bindu, but the spirit turns out Chitra (in the first part she is the one who cheated Sudheer on the name of love and gets ready to marry him because he is rich, but Sudheer at that time decided to commit suicide, after knowing her character, he went for the bungalow with his friends Praveen and Nandu). Then Chitra says that at the time of marriage, Sudheer didn't turn up and then suddenly her other boyfriend came to the wedding along with Bindu and they exposed Chitra's character in front of her father and other relatives. For that reason, wedding was canceled, then her ashamed father died from heart attack.  After seeing her father dead, she committed suicide. Then she became a spirit and possessed Bindu. Chitra swears revenge on Sudheer because she believed that Sudheer is responsible for her plight because he was not at the wedding.  She recognized Anita because she is the common friend of Bindu and Chitra. Then she tracked him down in the college with her new identity on the intention to torture him mentally and kill him. But he didn't any interest on him then she finds out that Nandu decided to possess her and leaves Bindu to die for having exposed her. Then she possessed Nandu successfully and started harassing him mentally. 
Finally she announced to kill Nandu to take her revenge and later kills him too. Then Sudheer struggles to explain  her that he was not responsible for her situation, that he  avoided to see her. But the situation gets worse, Chitra possesses Sudheer and tries to kill Nandu, but in the last minute, she possesses Nandu again and challenges  Sudheer that she can kill Nandu through his hands. Then Sudheer pleads her to leave, but he decides to sacrificing himself for Nandu because she is innocent and unaware of facts. Chitra stabs Sudheer to death and leaves Nandu. Later Bablu and Anita join them in a hospital where they were saved. After being informed on facts, Nandu comes to visit Sudheer, then Chitra possesses again and apologises for her foolish acts, understand the real love and leaves the world to remain solace.

Cast
 Sumanth Ashwin as Sudheer
 Nandita Swetha as Nandu
 Siddhi Idnani as Bindu
 Apoorva Srinivasan as Chitra
 Prabhas Sreenu
 Vidyullekha Raman as Anita
 Krishna Teja as Bablu
 NTV Sai

Soundtrack

The soundtrack is composed by Jeevan Babu and lyrics by Ananth Sriram, Kasarla Shyam and Purnachari.

References

External links 
 

2019 films
Indian romantic horror films
2019 comedy horror films
2019 horror films
Indian films about revenge
Indian comedy horror films
Indian sequel films
2010s Telugu-language films
2019 comedy films